Kunakbayevo (Qunaqbay) is a rural locality (a village) in Yermolayevsky Selsoviet, Kuyurgazinsky District, Bashkortostan, Russia. The population was 108 as of 2010. There are 6 streets.

Geography 
Kunakbayevo is located 18 km south of Yermolayevo (the district's administrative centre) by road. Molokanovo is the nearest rural locality.

References 

Rural localities in Kuyurgazinsky District